YSR Engineering College of YVU, Proddatur is located in the Indian state of Andhra Pradesh at Proddatur.The college offers 4-year B.Tech degree courses.

Overview
The admission into under graduate programmes is through a state level common entrance test EAMCET. YSR Engineering college of YVU, Proddatur is a constituent college of Yogi Vemana University.

Disciplines
Currently the college offers B.Tech courses in:
 Civil Engineering  
 Electrical and Electronics Engineering  
 Electronics and Communication Engineering  
 Mechanical Engineering  
 Computer Science and Engineering 
 Science and Humanities
 Metallurgy and Material Technology.

References

Universities and colleges in Kadapa district
2008 establishments in Andhra Pradesh
Educational institutions established in 2008